In geometry, the great ditrigonal icosidodecahedron (or great ditrigonary icosidodecahedron) is a nonconvex uniform polyhedron, indexed as U47. It has 32 faces (20 triangles and 12 pentagons), 60 edges, and 20 vertices. It has 4 Schwarz triangle equivalent constructions, for example Wythoff symbol 3 | 3  gives Coxeter diagram  = . It has extended Schläfli symbol a{,3} or c{3,}, as an altered great stellated dodecahedron or converted great icosahedron.

Its circumradius is  times the length of its edge, a value it shares with the cube.

Related polyhedra 

Its convex hull is a regular dodecahedron. It additionally shares its edge arrangement with the small ditrigonal icosidodecahedron (having the triangular faces in common), the ditrigonal dodecadodecahedron (having the pentagonal faces in common), and the regular compound of five cubes.

References

External links 
 VRML model: 
 MathWorld

Uniform polyhedra